Burg Golling is a castle in Golling an der Salzach, in the Austrian state of Salzburg, erected by the Prince-Archbishops of Salzburg in the 13th century.

See also
List of castles in Austria

References

This article was initially translated from the German Wikipedia.

Castles in Salzburg (state)